Salvador Roselli is a film director and screenplay writer.

He works in the cinema of Argentina.

Roselli is a graduate of Argentina's primary film school, the Universidad del Cine.

Filmography
Director and writer
 Mala época (1998)

Screenplay
 El Perro (2004) aka Bombón: El Perro
 Sofacama (2006) aka Sofabed
 Liverpool (2008) aka Liverpool
 Las Acacias (2011)
 El muerto y ser felíz (2012) aka The Dead Man and Being Happy

References

External links
 

Argentine film directors
Argentine screenwriters
Male screenwriters
Argentine male writers
Living people
Year of birth missing (living people)
Place of birth missing (living people)